The southern black racer (Coluber constrictor priapus) is one of the more common subspecies of the nonvenomous Coluber constrictor snake species of the Southeastern United States. The subspecific name priapus refers to the proximal spines of the hemipenes being much enlarged into basal hooks, which is characteristic of this subspecies. These snakes are quite active during the day, which increases the chance of sightings. They eat almost any animal they can overpower, including rodents, frogs, toads, and lizards. Members of this species generally do not tolerate handling – even after months in captivity – and typically strike and flail wildly every time they are handled, often defecating a foul-smelling musk, a common defense against predators in snakes. Adults of the species are usually thin with a jet black dorsal side with a grey belly and white chin. They are quite fast, giving them the name "racer".

Description
The southern black racer has a white chin, whereas an indigo snake normally has a dark to reddish-orange chin.

Diet 

The southern black racer is a predator that relies on lizards, insects, moles, birds, eggs, small snakes, rodents, and frogs.  Despite its specific name constrictor (scientific name: Coluber constrictor), the racer is more likely to suffocate or crush its victim into the ground, rather than coiling around it in typical constrictor fashion.

Humans remain the greatest enemy of black racers. Many are killed on highways and others are intentionally killed out of fear. The southern black racer can be mistaken for a cottonmouth – a venomous snake more commonly called a water moccasin. The venomous snake has a white lining inside of its mouth. Racers are nonvenomous and do not breed with cottonmouths. Natural enemies include such birds of prey as hawks, including the red-shouldered hawk and broad-winged hawk. These perching and soaring birds have keen eyesight and drop down from above to capture black racers and other snakes in a manner that makes the snake's speed and ground awareness ineffectual.

Gallery

References

Colubrids
Reptiles of the United States
Reptiles described in 1939
Fauna of the Southeastern United States